The Maha Oya is a major stream in the Sabaragamuwa Province of Sri Lanka. It runs across four provinces and five districts. Maha Oya has 14 Water supply networks to serve the need of water and more than 1 million people live by the river.

Its catchment area receives approximately 3644 million cubic metres of rain per year, and approximately 34 percent of the water reaches the sea. It has a catchment area of 1,510 square kilometres.

See also 
 List of dams and reservoirs in Sri Lanka
 List of rivers of Sri Lanka

References 

Rivers of Sri Lanka